Omphalotus olearius, commonly known as the jack-o'-lantern mushroom, is a poisonous orange gilled mushroom that to an untrained eye appears similar to some chanterelles. It is notable for its bioluminescent properties. It is found in woodland areas in Europe, where it grows on decaying stumps, on buried roots or at the base of hardwood trees. It has also been reported from the Western Cape Province, South Africa.  A similar, but phylogenetically distinct species found in eastern North America is Omphalotus illudens.

Unlike chanterelles, Omphalotus olearius and other Omphalotus species contain the toxin illudin S, and are poisonous to humans. While not lethal, consuming this mushroom leads to very severe cramps, vomiting, and diarrhea.

Description 
The jack-o'-lantern mushroom is orange. Its bioluminescence, a blue-green color, can be observed in fresh specimens in low light conditions once the eye becomes dark-adapted. The whole mushroom does not glow—only the gills do so.  This is due to an enzyme called luciferase, acting upon a compound called luciferin, leading to the emission of light much as fireflies do when glowing.

Similar species 
Unlike chanterelles, jack-o'-lantern mushrooms have true, sharp, non-forking gills; this is possibly the simplest trait for distinguishing between the two. Furthermore, if the jack-o'-lantern's stem is peeled, the inside is orange, while the chanterelle is paler inside the stem.

Omphalotus illudens of eastern North America, and the Western jack-o'-lantern mushroom Omphalotus olivascens common in southern to central California, are both poisonous. The similarly poisonous mushroom Tsukiyotake (Omphalotus japonicus, formerly known as Lampteromyces japonicus, found in Japan and eastern Asia, is also bioluminescent and contains the same poison, illudin.

See also
List of bioluminescent fungi

Gallery

References

External links

 AmericanMushrooms.com: Jack O'Lantern Mushroom
 Tom Volk's Fungus of the Month October 1997
 Iowa State University Horticulture & Home Pest News

Bioluminescent fungi
olearius
Poisonous fungi
Fungi of Europe